The following railroads operate in the U.S. state of Texas.

Common freight carriers

Class I
BNSF Railway (BNSF)
Kansas City Southern Railway (KCS)
Union Pacific Railroad (UP)

Class II
There are no Class II Railroads in Texas.

Class III
Alamo Gulf Coast Railroad (AGCR) - (Martin Marietta Inc.)
Angelina and Neches River Railroad (ANR)
Austin Western Railroad (AWRR) - (Watco)
Big Spring Rail (BSR)
Blacklands Railroad (BLR)
Border Pacific Railroad (BOP)
Brownsville and Rio Grande International Railroad (BRG)
CMC Railroad (CMC)
Corpus Christi Terminal Railroad (CCPN) - (Genesee & Wyoming)
Dallas, Garland and Northeastern Railroad (DGNO) - (Genesee & Wyoming)
Fort Worth and Western Railroad (FWWR)
Operates the Fort Worth & Dallas Belt Railroad (FWDB) and the Fort Worth and Dallas Railroad (FWDR)
Galveston Railroad (GVSR) - (Genesee & Wyoming)
Gardendale Railroad (GDR)
Georgetown Railroad (GRR)
Grainbelt Corporation (GNBC)
GT Logistics
Gulf Coast Switching (GCS)
Hondo Railway (HRR)
Kiamichi Railroad (KRR) - (Genesee & Wyoming)
La Salle Railway (LSRY)
Live Oak Railroad (LOR)
Lubbock and Western Railway (LBWR) - (Watco)
Moscow, Camden and San Augustine Railroad (MCSA) - (Georgia-Pacific)
Oak Grove Railroad
Orange Port Terminal Railway (OPT)
Panhandle Northern Railroad (PNR)
Pecos Valley Southern Railway (PVS) - (Watco)
Plainsman Switching Company (PSC)
Operates South Plains Switching, Ltd
Plainview Terminal Company (PTC)
Point Comfort and Northern Railway (PCN) - (Genesee & Wyoming)
Port Terminal Railroad Association (PTRA)
Rail Logix (Frontier Logistics LP)
Rio Valley Switching Company (RVSC) operates the Rio Valley Railroad (RVRR)
RJ Corman Texas Line (RJCD)
Sabine River and Northern Railroad (SRN)
San Antonio Central Railway (SAC) - (Watco)
San Jacinto Transportation (SJCT)
South Plains Lamesa Railroad (SLAL)
Southern Switching Company (SSC) operates the Lone Star Railroad (LSRR)
Southwest Gulf Railroad (SWG) - (Vulcan Materials Company)
Temple and Central Texas Railway (TC)
Texas Central Business Lines (TCB)
Texas City Terminal Railway (TCT) - (BNSF and UP)
Texas, Gonzales and Northern Railway (TXGN)
Texas & Eastern Railroad
Texas & New Mexico Railway (TXN) - (Watco)
Texas Northeastern Railroad (TNER) - (Genesee & Wyoming)
Texas and Northern Railway (TN)
Texas North Western Railway (TXNW)
Texas and Oklahoma Railroad (TXOR)
Texas Pacifico Transportation (TXPF) - (Grupo México)
Operator for the Texas state-owned South Orient Rail Line
Texas Rock Crusher Railway (TXR)
Texas South-Eastern Railroad (TSE)
Timber Rock Railroad (TIBR) - (Watco)
Western Rail Road (WRRC)
Wichita, Tillman and Jackson Railway (WTJR)

Passenger carriers

Intercity Passenger Rail
Amtrak (AMTK)
Heartland Flyer
Texas Eagle
Sunset Limited

Commuter Rail
A-train (Denton County Transportation Authority) (DCTA)
Capital MetroRail
operates the Austin and Northwestern Railroad
Trinity Railway Express (TREX) (DART and Trinity Metro)
TEXRail (Trinity Metro)

High Speed Rail
Texas Central Railway (Proposed; in ROW-acquisition phase)

Light Rail
DART Rail
Houston METRORail

Trolley and Streetcar
Dallas Streetcar (DART)
El Paso Street Car (Sun Metro)
Galveston Island Trolley
McKinney Avenue Trolley

Tourism Rail
Austin and Texas Central Railroad (ATCR) (Austin Steam Train Association)
Grapevine Vintage Railroad (operated on TEXRail)
Historic Jefferson Railway
Six Flags & Texas Railroad
Texas State Railroad
Longhorn and Western Railroad (Texas Transportation Museum)

Defunct railroads

Electric
Austin Dam and Suburban Railway
Belton–Temple Traction Company
Bryan and Central Texas Interurban Railway
Bryan and College Interurban Railway
Bryan–College Traction Company
Dallas Southern Traction Company
Denison and Sherman Railway
Eastern Texas Electric Company
Fort Worth Southern Traction Company
Galveston–Houston Electric Railway
Houston North Shore Railway
Jefferson County Traction Company
Northern Texas Traction Company
Rio Grande Valley Traction Company
Roby and Northern Railroad
Southern Traction Company
Southwestern Traction Company
Tarrant County Traction Company
Texas Electric Railway (TER)
Texas Interurban Railway
Texas Traction Company

Not completed
Brazos and Galveston Railroad
Columbus, San Antonio and Rio Grande Railroad
Enid, Ochiltree and Western Railroad
Gulf and West Texas Railway
Harrisburg Railroad and Trading Company
Houston, Trinity and Tyler Railroad
Pan American Railway
Temple–Northwestern Railway
Winnsboro and Gilmer Railroad

Notes

See also
Article X of the Texas Constitution

References
 Association of American Railroads (2003), Railroad Service in Texas (PDF). Retrieved May 19, 2005.
Handbook of Texas Online

 
 
Texas railroads
Railroads